Petaluma Downtown station is a Sonoma–Marin Area Rail Transit station in Petaluma. It opened to preview service on June 29, 2017; full commuter service commenced on August 25, 2017. A new platform and facilities were constructed adjacent to the historic Northwestern Pacific Railroad station building, which opened in 1914. It is the system's first station to open in the city, with Petaluma North station set to open later.

References

External links
Petaluma Downtown Station

Railway stations in the United States opened in 2017
Petaluma, California
Sonoma-Marin Area Rail Transit stations in Sonoma County
Railway stations in the United States opened in 1914
1914 establishments in California
Former Northwestern Pacific Railroad stations